John Owen (c.1702 – 20 February 1754) was a Welsh Whig politician.

He was appointed High Sheriff of Anglesey for 1725. He was a Member of Parliament (MP) for Anglesey 28 May 1741-16 Jul 1747 and Beaumaris 29 Jan 1753 – 22 Apr 1754.

He died in 1754 whilst travelling to London.

References

Year of birth uncertain
1754 deaths
Members of the Parliament of Great Britain for Welsh constituencies
High Sheriffs of Anglesey
Place of birth missing
British MPs 1741–1747
British MPs 1747–1754
Whig (British political party) MPs for Welsh constituencies
Members of the Parliament of Great Britain for Beaumaris